Steffen R. Mellemseter (born 26 June 1989 in Oppdal) is a Norwegian curler.

Teams

References

External links

Video: 

Living people
1989 births
People from Oppdal
Norwegian male curlers
Sportspeople from Trøndelag
21st-century Norwegian people